The 2022–23 Hong Kong Quadrangular Series was a Twenty20 International (T20I) cricket tournament, that took place in Hong Kong in March 2023. The participating teams were the hosts Hong Kong along with Bahrain, Kuwait and Malaysia. Shortly before the tournament, Cricket Hong Kong announced that former Kent County Cricket Club player Simon Willis became the new head coach of their senior men's team.

Malaysia and Hong Kong won their matches on the opening day of the series. Both sides won again on the following day to confirm that they would meet again in the final.

Hong Kong defeated Malaysia in the final by 39 runs to win the tournament.

The T20I tournament was followed by a 50-over One Day tri-series between Hong Kong, Kuwait and Malaysia. All competing teams used the 50-over event as preparation for the 2023 Men's Premier Cup.

Squads

Round-robin

Points table

 Qualified for the final
 Advanced to the third place play-off

Fixtures

Third place play-off

Final

References

External links
 Series home at ESPNcricinfo

Associate international cricket competitions in 2022–23
Sports competitions in Hong Kong
Hong Kong Quadrangular Series